Jean Mayer (born 22 October 1952) is a French sprinter. He competed in the men's 200 metres at the 1976 Summer Olympics.

References

1952 births
Living people
Athletes (track and field) at the 1976 Summer Olympics
French male sprinters
Olympic athletes of France
Place of birth missing (living people)